French-Canadian vocalist Céline Dion has been honored with numerous accolades throughout her long standing career. Dion has been recognized all over the world and received various awards including 5 Grammy Awards, 12 World Music Awards, 7 Billboard Music Awards, 6 American Music Awards, 20 Juno Awards, 50 Felix Awards and many more. She is the third most awarded artist in Juno Awards history and the most nominated artist ever (75). 

At age 14, Dion won the gold medal at the 13th Yamaha World Popular Song Festival in Tokyo for an audience of 115 million TV viewers. In 1988, she won the prestigious Eurovision Song Contest for an audience of 600 million TV viewers. In 1999, Dion received a star on Canada's Walk of Fame and was inducted into the Canadian Broadcast Hall of Fame. In January 2004, she was honored with a star on the Hollywood Walk of Fame. The World Music Awards honored her with the prestigious Chopard Diamond award in 2004 and Legend Award in 2007. In 2013, Dion was awarded the highest rank of the Order of Canada, the Companion of the Order of Canada, by the Governor General of Canada. In 2016, she was honored by the Billboard Music Awards with an Icon Award. In 2021, Boston's prestigious Berklee College of Music bestowed Dion with her second honorary doctorate in music.

American Music Awards

|-
|1995
|"The Power of Love"
|Favorite Pop/Rock Single
|
|-
|rowspan="2"|1997
|rowspan="7"|Celine Dion
|Favorite Pop/Rock Female Artist
|
|-
|Favorite Adult Contemporary Artist
|
|-
|rowspan="2"|1998
|Favorite Pop/Rock Female Artist
|
|-
|Favorite Adult Contemporary Artist
|
|-
|rowspan="4"|1999
|Artist of the Year
|
|-
|Favorite Pop/Rock Female Artist
|
|-
|Favorite Adult Contemporary Artist
|
|-
|Let's Talk About Love
|Favorite Pop/Rock Album
|
|-
|rowspan="2"|2001
|rowspan="6"|Celine Dion
|Favorite Pop/Rock Female Artist
|
|-
|Favorite Adult Contemporary Artist
|
|-
|rowspan="2"|2003
|Favorite Pop/Rock Female Artist
|
|-
|Favorite Adult Contemporary Artist
|
|-
|rowspan="2"|2003
|Favorite Pop/Rock Female Artist
|
|-
|Favorite Adult Contemporary Artist
|
|-

Amigo Awards

|-
|1997
|rowspan="2"|Celine Dion
|rowspan="2"|Best International Female Artist
|
|-
|1998
|
|-

Arion Music Awards

|-
|2003
|A New Day Has Come
|Best Selling International Album
|
|-

Bambi Awards

|-
|1996
|rowspan="3"|Celine Dion
|Top International Pop Star of the Year
|
|-
|1999
|For Sales of Over 10 Million CDs in Germany, Austria and Switzerland
|
|-
|2012
|In Recognition of the Long-Standing Musical Career
|
|-

Banff Television Foundation Awards

|-
|2002
|Celine Dion
|All-Time Famous Faces in Canadian Television
|
|-

Berklee College of Music's Honorary Doctorate in Music

|-
|2021
|Celine Dion
|Doctor in Music
|
|-

Best of Las Vegas Awards

|-
|2003
|A New Day...
|Best Overall Show
|
|-
|2004
|rowspan="5"|Celine Dion
|Best Singer
|
|-
|2005
|rowspan="2"|Best Headliner
|
|-
|2006
|
|-
|rowspan="3"|2007
|Best Singer
|
|-
|Best All-Around Performer
|
|-
|A New Day...
|Best Show Choreography
|
|-
|2008
|Celine Dion
|Best Singer
|
|-
|2012
|rowspan="2"|Celine
|rowspan="2"|Best Overall Show
|
|-
|2014
|
|-
|2016
|Celine Dion
|Best Singer
|
|-

Best of Montreal Awards

|-
|1997
|Celine Dion
|Most Desirable Woman
|
|-

Billboard Awards

Billboard Latin Music Awards

|-
|2002
|"My Heart Will Go On"
|First English-Language Song to Top Hot Latin Tracks
|
|-

Billboard Music Awards
According to Billboard, Dion has won seven awards.

|-
|rowspan="2"|1992
|Celine Dion
|Hot Adult Contemporary Artists
|
|-
|"If You Asked Me To"
|Hot Adult Contemporary Singles & Tracks
|
|-
|rowspan="6"|1994
|rowspan="4"|Celine Dion
|Top Pop Artists - Female
|
|-
|Top Billboard 200 Album Artists - Female
|
|-
|Hot 100 Singles Artists - Female
|
|-
|Hot Adult Contemporary Artists
|
|-
|rowspan="2"|"The Power of Love"
|Hot 100 Singles
|
|-
|Hot Adult Contemporary Singles & Tracks
|
|-
|rowspan="13"|1996
|rowspan="8"|Celine Dion
|Top Pop Artists
|
|-
|Top Pop Artists - Female
|
|-
|Top Billboard 200 Album Artists
|
|-
|Top Billboard 200 Album Artists - Female
|
|-
|Hot 100 Singles Artists
|
|-
|Hot 100 Singles Artists - Female
|
|-
|Hot Adult Contemporary Artists
|
|-
|Hot Adult Top 40 Artists
|
|-
|rowspan="4"|"Because You Loved Me"
|Hot 100 Singles
|
|-
|Hot 100 Singles Airplay
|
|-
|Hot Adult Contemporary Singles & Tracks
|
|-
|Hot Adult Top 40 Singles & Tracks
|
|-
|Falling into You
|Top Billboard 200 Albums
|
|-
|rowspan="6"|1997
|rowspan="5"|Celine Dion
|Top Pop Artists
|
|-
|Top Pop Artists - Female
|
|-
|Top Billboard 200 Album Artists
|
|-
|Top Billboard 200 Album Artists - Female
|
|-
|Hot Adult Contemporary Artists
|
|-
|Falling into You
|Top Billboard 200 Albums
|
|-
|rowspan="9"|1998
|rowspan="4"|Celine Dion
|Top Pop Artists - Female
|
|-
|Top Billboard 200 Album Artists
|
|-
|Top Billboard 200 Album Artists - Female
|
|-
|Hot Adult Contemporary Artists
|
|-
|rowspan="2"|"My Heart Will Go On"
|Hot Adult Contemporary Singles & Tracks
|
|-
|Hot Soundtrack Singles
|
|-
|Let's Talk About Love
|rowspan="2"|Top Billboard 200 Albums
|
|-
|rowspan="2"|Titanic: Music from the Motion Picture
|
|-
|Hot Soundtrack Albums
|
|-
|rowspan="2"|1999
|Celine Dion
|Top Billboard 200 Album Artists - Female
|
|-
|"I'm Your Angel"
|Hot 100 Singles Sales
|
|-
|rowspan="2"|2000
|rowspan="2"|Celine Dion
|Top Pop Artists - Female
|
|-
|Top Billboard 200 Artists - Female
|
|-
|2016
|Celine Dion
|Icon Award
|
|-

Billboard Touring Awards

|-
|2008
|Celine Dion at the Bell Centre in Montreal
|Top Boxscore
|
|-

Blockbuster Entertainment Awards

|-
|rowspan="2"|1997
|Celine Dion
|Favorite Female Artist - Pop
|
|-
|"Because You Loved Me"
|rowspan="2"|Favourite Song from a Movie
|
|-
|rowspan="2"|1999
|"My Heart Will Go On"
|
|-
|Titanic: Music from the Motion Picture
|Favorite Soundtrack
|
|-
|2000
|rowspan="2"|Celine Dion
|rowspan="2"|Favorite Female Artist - Pop
|
|-
|2001
|
|-

Bravo Otto Awards

|-
|1998
|Celine Dion
|Gold Otto for Female Singer
|
|-

Brit Awards

|-
|1996
|rowspan="3"|Celine Dion
|rowspan="3"|Best International Female Artist
|
|-
|1997
|
|-
|1998
|
|-

Canada's Walk of Fame

|-
|1999
|Celine Dion
|Inducted into Canada's Walk of Fame
|
|-

Canadian Broadcast Hall of Fame

|-
|1999
|Celine Dion
|Inducted into Canadian Broadcast Hall of Fame
|
|-

Canadian Radio Music Awards

|-
|2005
|Celine Dion
|Fans' Choice Award
|
|-

CBC Music Awards

|-
|2014
|Celine Dion
|Artist of the Year Award
|
|-

Chérie FM Stars

|-
|2005
|rowspan="3"|Celine Dion
|Honorary Award
|
|-
|rowspan="4"|2007
|Honorary Award for the Entire Career
|
|-
|Female Artist of the Year
|
|-
|D'elles
|Album of the Year
|
|-
|"Et s'il n'en restait qu'une (je serais celle-là)"
|French Song of the Year
|
|-

Chicago Film Critics Association Awards

|-
|1998
|Titanic: Music from the Motion Picture
|Best Original Score
|
|-

Coca-Cola Full Blast Music Awards

|-
|1997
|Celine Dion
|Most Popular International Artist of 1996
|
|-

Commemorative Medallion of the 400th Anniversary of Quebec City

|-
|2008
|Celine Dion
|Commemorative Medallion of the 400th Anniversary of Quebec City
|
|-

CRIA Special Awards

|-
|1999
|Celine Dion
|Best Selling Canadian Recording Artist of the Century
|
|-

Danish Music Awards

|-
|1997
|rowspan="3"|Celine Dion
|rowspan="3"|Best International Female Singer
|
|-
|1998
|
|-
|rowspan="2"|1999
|
|-
|"My Heart Will Go On"
|Best International Hit
|
|-

Dragon Awards

|-
|2003
|rowspan="2"|Celine Dion
|rowspan="2"|International Female Artist of the Year
|
|-
|2004
|
|-

Echo Awards

|-
|1997
|rowspan="4"|Celine Dion
|rowspan="4"|International Female Artist of the Year
|
|-
|1998
|
|-
|1999
|
|-
|2003
|
|-

Edison Awards

|-
|1995
|The Colour of My Love
|Best Album
|
|-
|rowspan="2"|1998
|Celine Dion
|Best International Female Singer
|
|-
|"Tell Him"
|Single of the Year
|
|-

Ella Awards

|-
|2004
|Celine Dion
|For Contribution to Music and Humanitarian and Community Support
|
|-

Eurovision Song Contest

|-
|1988
|"Ne partez pas sans moi"
|First Prize
|
|-

Félix Awards

|-
|1982
|rowspan="4"|Celine Dion
|rowspan="2"|Newcomer of the Year
|
|-
|rowspan="4"|1983
|
|-
|Artist of the Year Achieving the Most Success Outside Quebec
|
|-
|Female Vocalist of the Year
|
|-
|Tellement j'ai d'amour...
|Pop Album of the Year
|
|-
|rowspan="4"|1984
|rowspan="2"|Celine Dion
|Artist of the Year Achieving the Most Success Outside Quebec
|
|-
|Female Vocalist of the Year
|
|-
|rowspan="2"|Les chemins de ma maison
|Pop Album of the Year
|
|-
|Best Selling Album of the Year
|
|-
|rowspan="10"|1985
|rowspan="2"|Celine Dion
|Artist of the Year Achieving the Most Success Outside Quebec - French Market
|
|-
|Female Vocalist of the Year
|
|-
|rowspan="2"|"Une colombe"
|Song of the Year
|
|-
|Best Selling Single of the Year
|
|-
|"Une colombe" - Paul Baillargeon
|Arranger of the Year
|
|-
|rowspan="3"|Mélanie
|Album of the Year
|
|-
|Pop Album of the Year
|
|-
|Best Selling Album of the Year
|
|-
|Céline Dion en concert
|Show of the Year - Music and Pop Songs
|
|-
|Céline Dion en concert - Harvey Robitaille
|Sound Engineer of the Year
|
|-
|1986
|Opération beurre de pinottes
|Kids Album of the Year
|
|-
|rowspan="6"|1987
|Celine Dion
|Female Vocalist of the Year
|
|-
|"Fais ce que tu voudras"
|Video of the Year
|
|-
|rowspan="2"|"Incognito" - Jean-Alain Roussel
|Producer of the Year
|
|-
|Sound Engineer of the Year
|
|-
|"Comme un cœur froid" - Jean-Alain Roussel
|Arranger of the Year
|
|-
|Incognito
|Pop Album of the Year
|
|-
|rowspan="8"|1988
|rowspan="2"|Celine Dion
|Artist of the Year Achieving the Most Success Outside Quebec - French Market
|
|-
|Female Vocalist of the Year
|
|-
|"Incognito"
|Most Popular Song of the Year
|
|-
|rowspan="2"|Incognito tournée
|Best Stage Performance of the Year
|
|-
|Show of the Year
|
|-
|Incognito tournée - Jean Bissonnette
|Stage Director of the Year
|
|-
|Incognito tournée - Pierre Labonté
|Stage Designer of the Year
|
|-
|Incognito tournée - Michel Murphy
|Lighting Designer of the Year
|
|-
|1990
|rowspan="3"|Celine Dion
|Anglophone Artist of the Year
|
|-
|rowspan="4"|1991
|Artist of the Year Achieving the Most Success Outside Quebec
|
|-
|Artist of the Year Achieving the Most Success in a Language Other Than French
|
|-
|Unison Tour - René-Richard Cyr
|Stage Director of the Year
|
|-
|Unison Tour - Yves Aucoin
|Lighting Designer of the Year
|
|-
|rowspan="5"|1992
|rowspan="3"|Celine Dion
|Artist of the Year Achieving the Most Success Outside Quebec
|
|-
|Artist of the Year Achieving the Most Success in a Language Other Than French
|
|-
|Female Vocalist of the Year
|
|-
|rowspan="2"|Dion chante Plamondon
|Pop/Rock Album of the Year
|
|-
|Best Selling Album of the Year
|
|-
|rowspan="4"|1993
|rowspan="3"|Celine Dion
|Artist of the Year Achieving the Most Success Outside Quebec
|
|-
|Artist of the Year Achieving the Most Success in a Language Other Than French
|
|-
|Female Vocalist of the Year
|
|-
|"Quelqu'un que j'aime, quelqu'un qui m'aime"
|Most Popular Song of the Year
|
|-
|rowspan="4"|1994
|rowspan="3"|Celine Dion
|Artist of the Year Achieving the Most Success Outside Quebec
|
|-
|Artist of the Year Achieving the Most Success in a Language Other Than French
|
|-
|Female Vocalist of the Year
|
|-
|"L'amour existe encore"
|Video of the Year
|
|-
|rowspan="7"|1995
|rowspan="3"|Celine Dion
|Artist of the Year Achieving the Most Success Outside Quebec
|
|-
|Artist of the Year Achieving the Most Success in a Language Other Than French
|
|-
|Female Vocalist of the Year
|
|-
|rowspan="2"|"Pour que tu m'aimes encore"
|Most Popular Song of the Year
|
|-
|Video of the Year
|
|-
|rowspan="2"|D'eux
|Pop/Rock Album of the Year
|
|-
|Best Selling Album of the Year
|
|-
|rowspan="8"|1996
|rowspan="4"|Celine Dion
|Artist of the Year Achieving the Most Success Outside Quebec
|
|-
|Artist of the Year Achieving the Most Success in a Language Other Than French
|
|-
|Female Vocalist of the Year
|
|-
|Special Award
|
|-
|rowspan="2"|"Je sais pas"
|Most Popular Song of the Year
|
|-
|Video of the Year
|
|-
|D'eux
|Best Selling Album of the Year
|
|-
|D'eux Tour
|Show of the Year - Performer
|
|-
|rowspan="7"|1997
|rowspan="3"|Celine Dion
|Artist of the Year Achieving the Most Success Outside Quebec
|
|-
|Artist of the Year Achieving the Most Success in a Language Other Than French
|
|-
|Female Vocalist of the Year
|
|-
|rowspan="2"|"Les derniers seront les premiers"
|Most Popular Song of the Year
|
|-
|Video of the Year
|
|-
|rowspan="2"|Live à Paris
|Pop/Rock Album of the Year
|
|-
|Best Selling Album of the Year
|
|-
|1998
|rowspan="4"|Celine Dion
|rowspan="2"|Artist of the Year Achieving the Most Success in a Language Other Than French
|
|-
|1999
|
|-
|rowspan="3"|2000
|Artist of the Year Achieving the Most Success Outside Quebec
|
|-
|Female Vocalist of the Year
|
|-
|La dernière de Céline
|Show of the Year - Performer
|
|-
|rowspan="4"|2002
|Celine Dion
|Artist of the Year Achieving the Most Success in a Language Other Than French
|
|-
|rowspan="2"|"Sous le vent"
|Most Popular Song of the Year
|
|-
|Video of the Year
|
|-
|La Fureur - Spécial Céline Dion
|Television Show of the Year - Song
|
|-
|2003
|rowspan="2"|Celine Dion
|Artist of the Year Achieving the Most Success in a Language Other Than French
|
|-
|rowspan="3"|2004
|Female Vocalist of the Year
|
|-
|1 fille & 4 types
|Best Selling Album of the Year
|
|-
|celinedion.com
|Website of the Year
|
|-
|rowspan="2"|2005
|A New Day... Live in Las Vegas
|rowspan="2"|Anglophone Album of the Year
|
|-
|Miracle
|
|-
|rowspan="2"|2006
|Celine Dion
|Female Vocalist of the Year
|
|-
|"Je ne vous oublie pas"
|Most Popular Song of the Year
|
|-
|2007
|Céline : 25 ans d'amour, 25 ans de télé
|Television Show of the Year - Song
|
|-
|2008
|rowspan="2"|Celine Dion
|Honorary Award
|
|-
|rowspan="2"|2009
|Artist of the Year Achieving the Most Success Outside Quebec
|
|-
|Céline sur les Plaines
|DVD of the Year
|
|-
|rowspan="6"|2013
|rowspan="2"|Celine Dion
|Artist of the Year Achieving the Most Success Outside Quebec
|
|-
|Female Vocalist of the Year
|
|-
|"Parler à mon père"
|Most Popular Song of the Year
|
|-
|rowspan="2"|Sans attendre
|Adult Contemporary Album of the Year
|
|-
|Best Selling Album of the Year
|
|-
|Céline Dion... Sans attendre
|Television Show of the Year - Music
|
|-
|rowspan="3"|2014
|Celine Dion
|Artist of the Year Achieving the Most Success Outside Quebec
|
|-
|Loved Me Back to Life
|Anglophone Album of the Year
|
|-
|Céline... une seule fois
|Television Show of the Year - Music
|
|-
|rowspan="4"|2017
|Celine Dion
|Female Vocalist of the Year
|
|-
|rowspan="2"|Encore un soir
|Adult Contemporary Album of the Year
|
|-
|Best Selling Album of the Year
|
|-
|"Encore un soir"
|Most Popular Song of the Year
|

FiFi Awards

|-
|2004
|Celine Dion Parfums
|rowspan="2"|Women's Fragrance of the Year - Popular Appeal
|
|-
|rowspan="2"|2006
|rowspan="2"|Celine Dion Belong
|
|-
|Women's Best Packaging of the Year - Popular Appeal
|
|-
|rowspan="2"|2007
|rowspan="2"|Always Belong
|Women's Fragrance of the Year - Popular Appeal
|
|-
|Women's Best Packaging of the Year - Popular Appeal
|
|-
|2008
|Enchanting
|rowspan="2"|Women's Fragrance of the Year - Popular Appeal
|
|-
|2009
|Sensational
|
|-

FM Select Diamond Award

|-
|1997
|Celine Dion
|Top Female International Artist
|
|-

France Bleu Talent Awards

|-
|2013
|Celine Dion
|Honorary Award for the Long-Standing Career in France
|
|-

Fryderyk Awards

|-
|1998
|Let's Talk About Love
|Best Foreign Album
|
|-

GAFFA Awards

GAFFA Awards (Denmark)
Delivered since 1991, the GAFFA Awards are a Danish award that rewards popular music by the magazine of the same name.

!
|-
| 1997
| Herself
| Foreign Female Act
| 
| style="text-align:center;" |
|-

Gémeaux Awards

|-
|rowspan="6"|1988
|rowspan="6"|Céline Dion - Incognito
|Best Cinematography: All Categories: Variety, Performing Arts or Humor
|
|-
|Best Lighting: Program or Series: All Categories
|
|-
|Best Direction: Program, Variety Series or Performing Arts
|
|-
|Best Production Design: All Categories
|
|-
|Best Costume Design: All Categories
|
|-
|Best Makeup/Hair: All Categories
|
|-
|rowspan="3"|1990
|rowspan="3"|Céline Dion - Unison
|Best Variety Special
|
|-
|Best Direction: Humor or Variety Special
|
|-
|Best Editing: Variety, Humor, Performing Arts or Documentary Arts
|
|-
|rowspan="5"|1992
|rowspan="3"|Céline Dion: 10 ans déjà
|Best Variety Special
|
|-
|Best Direction: Variety Series or Special
|
|-
|Best Sound: All Categories: Variety, Humor, Performing Arts or Documentary Arts
|
|-
|rowspan="2"|Dion chante Plamondon
|Best Variety Special
|
|-
|Best Direction: Variety Series or Special
|
|-
|1995
|Céline Dion - D'eux
|Best Variety Special
|
|-
|rowspan="2"|1996
|rowspan="2"|Céline Dion - spécial d'enfer
|Best Variety Special
|
|-
|Best Animation: Series or Variety Special
|
|-
|rowspan="6"|1998
|rowspan="4"|Let's Talk About Love avec Céline Dion
|Best Variety Special
|
|-
|Best Direction: Variety Series or Special
|
|-
|Best Interview: All Categories
|
|-
|Audience Award
|
|-
|rowspan="2"|Let's talk from Las Vegas, Céline
|Best Variety Special
|
|-
|Best Direction: Variety Series or Special
|
|-
|rowspan="2"|1999
|rowspan="2"|Un an avec Céline
|Best Variety
|
|-
|Best Direction: All Variety Categories
|
|-
|rowspan="2"|2000
|rowspan="2"|La dernière de Céline
|Best Variety
|
|-
|Best Direction: All Variety Categories
|
|-
|rowspan="3"|2003
|rowspan="3"|La Petite Vie: Noël chez les pare
|Best Performance: Humor
|
|-
|Best Comedy Series or Special
|
|-
|Best Writing: Humor, Variety, Talk Show
|
|-

Gemini Awards

|-
|1992
|Celine Dion at the Juno Awards of 1991
|rowspan="3"|Best Performance in a Variety Program or Series
|
|-
|1994
|Celine Dion at the Juno Awards of 1993
|
|-
||1995
|Celine Dion in The Colour of My Love Concert
|
|-

Governor General's Awards

|-
|1992
|Celine Dion
|Medal of Recognition for the Contribution to Canadian Culture
|
|-

Grammy Awards

|-
|rowspan="4"|1993
|rowspan="2"|"Beauty and the Beast"
|Record of the Year
|
|-
|Best Pop Performance by a Duo or Group with Vocal
|
|-
|rowspan="1"|Beauty and the Beast: Original Motion Picture Soundtrack
|Album of the Year
|
|-
|Celine Dion
|Best Pop Vocal Performance, Female
|
|-
||1994
||"When I Fall in Love"
|Best Pop Performance by a Duo or Group with Vocal
|
|-
|1995
|"The Power of Love"
|Best Female Pop Vocal Performance
|
|-
|rowspan="4"|1997
|rowspan="2"|"Because You Loved Me"
|Record of the Year
|
|-
|Best Female Pop Vocal Performance
|
|-
|rowspan="2"|Falling into You
|Album of the Year
|
|-
|Best Pop Album
|
|-
|1998
|"Tell Him"
|Best Pop Collaboration with Vocals
|
|-
|rowspan="4"|1999
|rowspan="2"|"My Heart Will Go On"
|Record of the Year
|
|-
|Best Female Pop Vocal Performance
|
|-
|"I'm Your Angel"
|Best Pop Collaboration with Vocals
|
|-
|Let's Talk About Love
|Best Pop Album
|
|-
|2000
|"The Prayer"
|rowspan="2"|Best Pop Collaboration with Vocals
|
|-
|2001
|"All the Way"
|
|-

Grand Prix - Union nationale des auteurs compositeurs (UNAC)

|-
|2013
|Parler à mon père
|Song of the Year
|
|-

Guinness World Records

|-
|2018
|Celine Dion
|Most JUNO Awards won for Album of the Year
|
|-
|2017
|Pour que tu m'aimes encore
|Best-selling single (Canada)
|
|-
|2017
|D'eux
|Best-selling album (France)
|
|-
|2003
|Celine Dion
|Top selling album act in Europe
|
|-

Hungarian Music Awards

|-
|1998
|Let's Talk About Love
|International Album of the Year
|
|-

Hollywood Walk of Fame

|-
|2004
|Celine Dion
|Star on the Hollywood Walk of Fame
|
|-

IFPI Hong Kong Top Sales Music Awards

|-
|2002
|A New Day Has Come
|Best Sales Releases, Foreign
|
|-

IFPI Special Awards

|-
|rowspan="2"|2003
|rowspan="2"|Celine Dion
|Special Award for Selling 50 Million Albums in Europe
|
|-
|Special Award for Selling 10 Million Copies of Let's Talk About Love in Europe
|
|-

International Achievement in Arts Awards

|-
|1997
|Celine Dion
|Entertainer of the Year for Distinguished Achievement in Music
|
|-

IRMA Awards

|-
|1996
|The Colour of My Love
|rowspan="2"|Best International Female Artist Album
|
|-
|1997
|Falling into You
|
|-

Japan Gold Disc Awards

|-
|1996
|"To Love You More"
|International Single Grand Prix Award
|
|-
|rowspan="2"|1998
|Celine Dion
|International Artist of the Year
|
|-
|Let's Talk About Love
|International Pop Album of the Year
|
|-
|rowspan="5"|1999
|Celine Dion
|International Artist of the Year
|
|-
|"My Heart Will Go On"
|International Song of the Year
|
|-
|These Are Special Times
|International Pop Album of the Year
|
|-
|Titanic: Music from the Motion Picture
|International Soundtrack Album of the Year
|
|-
|VH1 Divas Live
|International Music Video of the Year
|
|-
|rowspan="2"|2000
|Celine Dion
|International Artist of the Year
|
|-
|All the Way... A Decade of Song
|International Pop Album of the Year
|
|-

Japan Record Awards

|-
|1998
|"My Heart Will Go On"
|Special Achievement Award
|
|-

Juno Awards

|-
|1987
|rowspan="3"|Celine Dion
|Most Promising Female Vocalist of the Year
|
|-
|1989
|rowspan="2"|Female Vocalist of the Year
|
|-
|rowspan="4"|1991
|
|-
|"Unison" (Mainstream Mix)
|Best Dance Recording
|
|-
|Unison
|Album of the Year
|
|-
|"Have a Heart," "Love by Another Name" - David Foster
|Producer of the Year
|
|-
|rowspan="2"|1992
|rowspan="4"|Celine Dion
|Female Vocalist of the Year
|
|-
|Canadian Entertainer of the Year
|
|-
|rowspan="7"|1993
|Female Vocalist of the Year
|
|-
|Canadian Entertainer of the Year
|
|-
|"Beauty and the Beast"
|rowspan="2"|Single of the Year
|
|-
|"If You Asked Me To"
|
|-
|"Love Can Move Mountains" (Club Mix)
|Best Dance Recording
|
|-
|Dion chante Plamondon
|Best Selling Francophone Album
|
|-
|Celine Dion
|Album of the Year
|
|-
|rowspan="4"|1994
|rowspan="2"|Celine Dion
|Female Vocalist of the Year
|
|-
|Canadian Entertainer of the Year
|
|-
|"Love Can Move Mountains"
|Single of the Year
|
|-
|"The Power of Love" - David Foster
|Producer of the Year
|
|-
|rowspan="4"|1995
|Celine Dion
|Canadian Entertainer of the Year
|
|-
|"The Power of Love"
|Single of the Year
|
|-
|rowspan="2"|The Colour of My Love
|Album of the Year
|
|-
|Best Selling Album (Foreign or Domestic)
|
|-
|rowspan="4"|1996
|Celine Dion
|Female Vocalist of the Year
|
|-
|rowspan="3"|D'eux
|Album of the Year
|
|-
|Best Selling Album (Foreign or Domestic)
|
|-
|Best Selling Francophone Album
|
|-
|rowspan="6"|1997
|rowspan="2"|Celine Dion
|Female Vocalist of the Year
|
|-
|International Achievement Award
|
|-
|"Because You Loved Me"
|Single of the Year
|
|-
|rowspan="2"|Falling into You
|Album of the Year
|
|-
|Best Selling Album (Foreign or Domestic)
|
|-
|Live à Paris
|Best Selling Francophone Album
|
|-
|1998
|"Miles to Go (Before I Sleep)," "Where Is the Love" - Corey Hart
|Producer of the Year
|
|-
|rowspan="8"|1999
|rowspan="2"|Celine Dion
|Best Female Vocalist
|
|-
|International Achievement Award
|
|-
|"My Heart Will Go On"
|Best Single
|
|-
|rowspan="3"|Let's Talk About Love
|Best Album
|
|-
|Best Pop Album
|
|-
|rowspan="2"|Best Selling Album (Foreign or Domestic)
|
|-
|Titanic: Music from the Motion Picture
|
|-
|S'il suffisait d'aimer
|Best Selling Francophone Album
|
|-
|rowspan="3"|2000
|Celine Dion
|Best Female Artist
|
|-
|rowspan="2"|These Are Special Times
|Best Album
|
|-
|Best Selling Album (Foreign or Domestic)
|
|-
|rowspan="4"|2003
|rowspan="2"|Celine Dion
|Artist of the Year
|
|-
|Fan Choice Award
|
|-
|"A New Day Has Come"
|Single of the Year
|
|-
|A New Day Has Come
|Album of the Year
|
|-
|rowspan="4"|2004
|rowspan="2"|Celine Dion
|Artist of the Year
|
|-
|Fan Choice Award
|
|-
|One Heart
|Album of the Year
|
|-
|1 fille & 4 types
|Francophone Album of the Year
|
|-
|rowspan="3"|2005
|Celine Dion
|Artist of the Year
|
|-
|rowspan="2"|Miracle
|Album of the Year
|
|-
|Pop Album of the Year
|
|-
|2006
|rowspan="3"|Celine Dion
|Fan Choice Award
|
|-
|rowspan="6"|2008
|Artist of the Year
|
|-
|Fan Choice Award
|
|-
|rowspan="2"|D'elles
|Album of the Year
|
|-
|Francophone Album of the Year
|
|-
|rowspan="2"|Taking Chances
|Album of the Year
|
|-
|Pop Album of the Year
|
|-
|rowspan="3"|2009
|Celine Dion
|Fan Choice Award
|
|-
|"Taking Chances"
|Single of the Year
|
|-
|Live in Las Vegas: A New Day...
|rowspan="2"|Music DVD of the Year
|
|-
|2011
|Tournée mondiale Taking Chances: le spectacle
|
|-
|rowspan="3"|2013
|Celine Dion
|Fan Choice Award
|
|-
|rowspan="2"|Sans attendre
|Album of the Year
|
|-
|Adult Contemporary Album of the Year
|
|-
|-
|rowspan="4"|2014
|rowspan="2"|Celine Dion
|Artist of the Year
|
|-
|Fan Choice Award
|
|-
|rowspan="2"|Loved Me Back to Life
|Album of the Year
|
|-
|Adult Contemporary Album of the Year
|
|-
|-
|rowspan="2"|2017
|rowspan="2"|Encore un Soir
|Album of the Year
|
|-
|Adult Contemporary Album of the Year
|
|-
|-
|rowspan="3"|2021
|rowspan="2"|Courage
|Album of the Year
|
|-
|Adult Contemporary Album of the Year
|
|-
|Celine Dion
|Artist of the Year
|
|-
|-

Karv l'anti-gala

|-
|rowspan="2"|2007
|rowspan="7"|Celine Dion
|Celebrity You Would Most Trust as Premier of Quebec
|
|-
|Female Artist You Would Like to Have as a Mother
|
|-
|rowspan="4"|2008
|Celebrity with the Coolest Look
|
|-
|Artist You Would Like to Have as a Mother
|
|-
|Singer/Group You Would Most Like to Go on Tour With
|
|-
|Celebrity You Would Trust with the Power to Solve the World's Problems
|
|-
|2010
|Personality of the Year
|
|-

Kraków's Walk of Fame

|-
|2008
|Celine Dion
|Inducted into Kraków's Walk of Fame
|
|-

Las Vegas Film Critics Society Awards

|-
|1998
|"My Heart Will Go On"
|Best Song
|
|-

Laval University's Honorary Doctorate in Music

|-
|2008
|Celine Dion
|In Recognition of the Personal and Professional Achievements
|
|-

Le Journal de Montréal Awards

|-
|2009
|Celine Dion
|Artist of the Decade
|
|-

Legion of Honour

|-
|2008
|Celine Dion
|Knight of the Legion of Honour for Merits and Contributions to France
|
|-

Lockdown Awards (LiveXLive)

|-
|2020
|The Prayer (with Lady Gaga, Andrea Bocelli & John Legend)
|Stronger Together, Favorite Group/All-Star Performance
|
|-

Los Angeles Film Critics Association Awards

|-
|1997
|Titanic: Music from the Motion Picture
|Best Music
|
|-

Malta Music Awards

|-
|1996
|rowspan="2"|Celine Dion
|Best Selling International Artist
|
|-
|1997
|Best Selling Female International Artist
|
|-

Medal of Quebec City

|-
|2008
|Celine Dion
|Medal of Quebec City
|
|-

MetroStar Awards

|-
|rowspan="3"|1987
|rowspan="7"|Celine Dion
|Female Vocalist of the Year
|
|-
|Young Artist of the Year
|
|-
|Female Personality of the Year
|
|-
|rowspan="4"|1988
|Female Vocalist of the Year
|
|-
|Young Artist of the Year
|
|-
|Female Personality of the Year
|
|-
|Jury Award
|
|-

Midem Awards

|-
|rowspan="2"|1996
|rowspan="3"|Celine Dion
|Award for Combined European Sales of Over 10 Million Units in 1995
|
|-
|Award for Sales of Over 4 Million Units Worldwide for the Album D'eux
|
|-
|2002
|Best Selling Artist In Europe
|
|-

MovieEntertainment Awards

|-
|2006
|Celine Dion
|Entertainment Industry's Most Influential Canadian
|
|-

MTV Awards

MTV Europe Music Awards

|-
|1998
|Celine Dion
|Best Female
|
|-

MTV Movie Awards

|-
|1994
|"When I Fall in Love"
|rowspan="2"|Best Song from a Movie
|
|-
|1998
|"My Heart Will Go On"
|
|-

MTV Asia Awards

|-
|rowspan="2"|1999
|"My Heart Will Go On"
|International Song of the Year
|
|-

MTV Video Music Awards

|-
|rowspan="2"|1998
|rowspan="2"|"My Heart Will Go On"
|Best Video from a Film
|
|-
|Viewer's Choice
|
|-

MTV Video Music Awards Japan

|-
|2008
|"A World to Believe In"
|Best Collaboration
|
|-

MuchMusic Video Awards

|-
|1990
|"Can't Live with You, Can't Live Without You"
|Best MOR Video
|
|-
|1992
|"Je danse dans ma tête"
|Best Adult Contemporary Video
|
|-
|1997
|Celine Dion
|People's Choice: Favourite International Artist
|
|-
|1998
|"My Heart Will Go On"
|Peoples Choice: Favourite Artist
|
|-
|1999
|"I'm Your Angel"
|rowspan="5"|MuchMoreMusic Award
|
|-
|2000
|"That's the Way It Is"
|
|-
|2002
|"A New Day Has Come"
|
|-
|2003
|"I Drove All Night"
|
|-
|2005
|"You and I"
|
|-

NARM Best Seller Awards

|-
|rowspan="3"|1997
|Celine Dion
|1996-1997 Artist of the Year
|
|-
|rowspan="2"|Falling into You
|1996-1997 Recording of the Year
|
|-
|1996-1997 Pop Recording
|
|-
|1998
|Titanic: Music from the Motion Picture
|1997-1998 Soundtrack
|
|-

National Order of Quebec

|-
|1998
|Celine Dion
|Appointed Officer of the National Order of Quebec
|
|-

National Post Awards

|-
|2002
|Celine Dion
|Most Recognized Canadian
|
|-

National TV 2 Awards

|-
|1997
|Celine Dion
|Best International Female Artist
|
|-

Nevada Ballet Theatre Awards

|-
|2004
|Celine Dion
|Woman of the Year for Significant Contribution to the Performing Arts
|
|-

Nevada Commission on Tourism Awards

|-
|2007
|Celine Dion
|Entertainer of the New Millennium
|
|-

NRJ Music Awards

|-
|rowspan="2"|2000
|Celine Dion
|Francophone Female Artist of the Year
|
|-
|Au cœur du stade
|Francophone Album of the Year
|
|-
|2002
|"Sous le vent"
|Francophone Duo/Group of the Year
|
|-
|2004
|1 fille & 4 types
|Francophone Album of the Year
|
|-
|2006
|rowspan="3"|Celine Dion
|rowspan="2"|Francophone Female Artist of the Year
|
|-
|rowspan="2"|2008
|
|-
|Honorary Award
|
|-
|2016
|Encore un soir
|Francophone Female Artist of the Year
|
|-

Order of Canada

|-
|1998
|rowspan="2"|Celine Dion
|Officer of the Order of Canada for Outstanding Contribution to the World of Contemporary Music
|
|-
|2008
|Companion of the Order of Canada for Worldwide Musical Influence and Commitment to Numerous Humanitarian Causes
|
|-

Ordre des Arts et des Lettres

|-
|1996
|Celine Dion
|Knight of the Ordre des Arts et des Lettres for Best Selling French-Language Artist in History
|
|-

People's Choice Awards

|-
|1999
|rowspan="5"|Celine Dion
|rowspan="3"|Favorite Female Musical Performer
|
|-
|2000
|
|-
|2003
|
|-
|rowspan="2"|2019
|The Style Star of 2019
|
|-
|The Most Hype Worthy Canadian of 2019
|

Performance Magazine Awards

|-
|1998
|Celine Dion
|Best Pop Act
|
|-

Platinum Ticket Awards

|-
|1990
|Celine Dion
|For Selling Over 100,000 Tickets of the Unison Tour in Quebec
|
|-

Pollstar Awards

|-
|2021
|Celine Dion
|Pop Touring Artist of the Decade
|
|-

Pop Corn Music Awards

|-
|rowspan="2"|1997
|Celine Dion
|Best Female Singer of the Year
|
|-
|Falling into You
|Best Album of the Year
|
|-
|1998
|Celine Dion
|Best Female Singer of the Year
|
|-

Radio France Internationale Awards

|-
|1996
|"Pour que tu m'aimes encore"
|Francophone Council Song
|
|-

Satellite Awards

|-
|rowspan="2"|1998
|"My Heart Will Go On"
|Best Original Song
|
|-
|Titanic: Music from the Motion Picture
|Best Original Score
|
|-

Saturn Awards

|-
|1993
|Beauty and the Beast: Original Motion Picture Soundtrack
|Best Music
|
|-

SOCAN Awards

|-
|rowspan="2"|2003
|rowspan="3"|"A New Day Has Come"
|Pop Music
|
|-
|International Achievement
|
|-
|2009
|Classic Songs
|
|-

SOCAN Francophone Awards

|-
|2006
|"Tout près du bonheur"
|Song of the Year
|
|-
|2012
|"Entre deux mondes"
|Songwriter of the Year
|
|-

Sony Music Entertainment Awards

|-
|1999
|rowspan="5"|Celine Dion
|Special Award for Selling Over 100 Million Albums Worldwide
|
|-
|2002
|Special Award for Selling Over 15 Million Albums and Singles in the UK
|
|-
|rowspan="3"|2008
|Special Award for Selling Over 3 Million Albums in South Africa
|
|-
|Special Award for Selling Over 1 Million Albums in Poland
|
|-
|Special Award for the Only Artist with 7 Million-Selling Albums in Canada
|
|-

South African Music Awards

|-
|1998
|Falling into You
|rowspan="2"|Best Selling International Album
|
|-
|1999
|Let's Talk About Love
|
|-

The Canadian Arts and Fashion Awards

|-
|2018
|Céline Dion
|International Style Icon Award
|
|-

UNESCO Awards

|-
|1999
|Celine Dion
|UNESCO Artist for Peace
|
|-

VH1 Awards

|-
|1996
|rowspan="4"|Celine Dion
|rowspan="2"|Artist of the Year
|
|-
|rowspan="3"|1998
|
|-
|Best Female Artist
|
|-
|Diva of the Year
|
|-

What's On, The Las Vegas Guide Visitors' Choice Awards

|-
|2005
|rowspan="2"|Celine Dion
|rowspan="2"|Favorite Headliner
|
|-
|2006
|
|-

Victoires de la Musique

|-
|1994
|rowspan="3"|Celine Dion
|rowspan="3"|Francophone Artist or Group of the Year
|
|-
|1995
|
|-
|rowspan="3"|1996
|
|-
|rowspan="2"|"Pour que tu m'aimes encore"
|Song of the Year
|
|-
|Music Video of the Year
|
|-
|rowspan="2"|1999
|Celine Dion
|Female Artist of the Year
|
|-
|S'il suffisait d'aimer
|Pop, Rock Album of the Year
|
|-
|2000
|Celine Dion at the Stade de France
|Musical, Tour or Concert of the Year
|
|-
|2002
|"Sous le vent"
|Original Song of the Year
|
|-
|2013
|Celine Dion
|Female Artist of the Year
|
|-

World Music Awards

|-
|1992
|rowspan="15"|Celine Dion
|rowspan="2"|World's Best Selling Canadian Female Artist of the Year
|
|-
|1995
|
|-
|1996
|World's Best Selling Canadian Artist of the Year
|
|-
|rowspan="3"|1997
|World's Best Selling Artist of the Year
|
|-
|World's Best Selling Pop Artist of the Year
|
|-
|rowspan="2"|World's Best Selling Canadian Artist of the Year
|
|-
|1998
|
|-
|1999
|rowspan="2"|World's Best Selling Female Pop Artist of the Year
|
|-
|2000
|
|-
|2004
|Diamond Award for Selling Over 100 Million Albums
|
|-
|2007
|Legend Award for Outstanding Contribution to the Music Industry
|
|-
|2008
|World's Best Selling Canadian Artist of the Year
|
|-
|rowspan="4"|2013
|World's Best Female Artist
|
|-
|World's Best Live Act
|
|-
|World's Best Entertainer of the Year
|
|-
|rowspan="1"|Sans attendre
|World's Best Album
|
|-
|rowspan="6"|2014
|rowspan="3"|Celine Dion
|World's Best Female Artist
|
|-
|World's Best Live Act
|
|-
|World's Best Entertainer of the Year
|
|-
|Sans attendre
|rowspan="2"|World's Best Album
|
|-
|Loved Me Back to Life
|
|-
|"Incredible"
|World's Best Song
|
|-

World Popular Song Festival Awards

|-
|rowspan="2"|1982
|"Tellement j'ai d'amour pour toi"
|Outstanding Song Award
|
|-
|Celine Dion
|Yamaha Pops Orchestra's Maestro Award for Best Artist
|
|-

Webby Awards

|-
|2020
|Celine Dion
|Webby People's Voice Award for Experimental & Innovation (Social)
|
|-

See also 
 List of Celine Dion records and achievements

References

External links
 CelineDion.com > Awards

Awards
Dion, Celine